Lachlan Keith Murdoch (born 8 September 1971) is a British-Australian businessman and mass media heir. He is the executive chairman of Nova Entertainment, co-chairman of News Corp, executive chairman and CEO of Fox Corporation, and the founder of Australian investment company Illyria Pty Ltd.

Early life and education
Lachlan Murdoch was born on 8 September 1971 at Wimbledon Hospital in Wimbledon, London, England. He is the eldest son of Australian-born American media mogul Rupert Murdoch, and his former wife, Scottish journalist and author Anna Maria dePeyster (née Torv; formerly Murdoch). He was raised in New York City where his father owned the New York Post. He received his primary and secondary education at the Aspen Country Day School in Aspen, Colorado, Trinity School in New York City, and at Phillips Academy in Andover, Massachusetts. In 1994, he graduated with a bachelor's degree in philosophy from Princeton University. While at Princeton, he studied philosophy with Béatrice Longuenesse and Alan Hajek.

Career

News Corp executive
In 1989, Rupert Murdoch brought Lachlan Murdoch, then 18 years old, to Australia while on business, to have Lachlan trained for three months at the Daily Mirror. At the age of 22, Murdoch was appointed general manager of Queensland Newspapers, the publisher of Brisbane's Courier-Mail. One year later, he became publisher of Australia's first national paper, The Australian. In 1995 he was appointed deputy CEO of News Limited, executive director of News Corporation in 1996, deputy chief operating officer in 2000; he was made senior executive vice president from 1999 to 2000, and has been chairman of STAR since 1995.

Encouraged to invest in One.Tel by his friend Australian businessman James Packer, the son of television network owner Kerry Packer, Murdoch was extensively criticized for encouraging News Corporation's multi-hundred million-dollar investment in the start-up telecommunications company. In April 2014, Murdoch and Packer agreed to an 40 million settlement over the failure of One.Tel. The settlement was approved by the Supreme Court of New South Wales on 17 April 2014, with 14.93 million to be paid by the Packer family's Consolidated Press Holdings, 11.77 million to be paid by Packer's Crown Resorts and 13.3 million to be paid by News Corp.

Murdoch led an initial $10.75 million investment, of which only $2.25 million was in cash, in REA Group, and subsequently championed the retention of the investment over the objections of those who wished to sell it. The company later emerged as Australia's market leader in online real estate advertising, and in 2014 was assessed as worth more than $3.6 billion to News Corp. With a personal interest in Australian rugby league, on 30 March 1995 Murdoch was at the first Super League meeting in the Atanaskovic Hartnell offices in Sydney. He and former Brisbane Broncos chief John Ribot signed up leading Canterbury-Bankstown Bulldogs players on documents which were not legally effective. Murdoch was the Broncos' number one ticket holder. For the year 2001, Murdoch earned a salary of 2.59 million. In June 2005, Murdoch received the Press & Outdoor Advertising  "media person of the year" award in Cannes. Murdoch is one of the founding patrons (along with Anthony Pratt, Peter Lowy and Lisa Fox) of an organisation called "Advance", formerly known as the Young Australian Professionals in America.

In July 2005, the 33-year-old Murdoch abruptly resigned as an executive at the News Corp. The unexplained departure apparently dashed News Corp. Chief executive Rupert Murdoch's hopes that his son would one day take over as CEO of the global media empire, which then included the Twentieth Century Fox movie studio, now a subsidiary of Disney Studios; and includes the Fox television network, several satellite broadcasters, and newspapers in Britain, Australia, and the United States. Roger Ailes, the chairman of Fox News Channel, was named chairman of News Corp's group of television stations to succeed Murdoch junior. Media speculated that his brother, James Murdoch, then chief executive of UK satellite TV company BSkyB, may succeed Rupert Murdoch. During his time as an executive at News Corp, Murdoch was the deputy chief operating officer of News Corporation, now 21st Century Fox. He had oversight of HarperCollins and the company's lines of business in Australia, including REA. He also served on the board of Foxtel and as chairman of Fox Television stations and was the publisher of the New York Post. He was appointed to the News Corp board in 1996.

Private investment activities
On leaving News Corp with a twoyear noncompete agreement, Murdoch founded an Australian private investment company, Illyria Pty Ltd., and developed an eclectic mix of investments, with stakes in the Indian Premier League (IPL) cricket team Rajasthan Royals, online DVD rental company Quickflix, toy marketer Funtastic and digital media company Destra. On 21 January 2008, Murdoch and James Packer announced that their companies, Illyria and Consolidated Press Holdings would seek to privatise the publicly-listed Consolidated Media Holdings. It was expected that the proposed 3.3 billion deal would deliver Murdoch and Packer with private stakes in Foxtel, Fox Sports, Universal Media Firm, LLC and PBL Media, with the latter owning the Nine Network and ACP Magazines. Packer eventually decided to sell down his stake in media companies in a series of transactions between 2006 and 2008, and the deal with Murdoch collapsed.

In November 2009, Murdoch acquired 50% of Nova Entertainment via Illyria and he became chairman. In September 2012 Illyria acquired the balance of shares it did not own.

In 2010, Packer purchased an 18% stake in Network Ten, quickly offloading half to Murdoch. Both Packer and Murdoch joined the Ten board. In February 2011, Murdoch was appointed acting CEO of Ten Network Holdings after the company's board terminated the contract of CEO Grant Blackley. The following month Packer unexpectedly resigned from the board. In February 2012, the Ten board appointed Murdoch non-executive chairman of Ten Network Holdings. Although Ten was already in some financial difficulties before Murdoch became CEO, by late 2012, on paper Illyria had lost 110 million of the original 150 million invested since 2010. The share price had fallen by about 80% and network profits had dropped by over half. In an attempt to control costs, Ten had reduced employment numbers by 160 people, and the problems were mainly attributed to falling advertising revenues and restructuring at the network. Ten purchased, at three times its original cost, the Australian rights for MasterChef from the Australian subsidiary of the Shine Group, itself a subsidiary of the News Corpowned 21st Century Fox. On 14 June 2017, Ten went into voluntary administration after Murdoch and fellow shareholder Bruce Gordon declined to extend the company's credit facility. Two bids were received for Ten; one from Murdoch and Gordon and one from CBS Corporation - Ten's largest creditor. The CBS bid was preferred by both the administrators and creditors. CBS's successful bid meant Murdoch lost his entire investment in the network.

Return to the family fold
In March 2014, Murdoch was appointed as non-executive co-chairman of News Corp. and 21st Century Fox Inc. in a move that was seen as succession planning for the media empire. Murdoch stood aside as chairman and a Director of Ten Network Holdings.  In June 2015 he was named as Executive Chairman of 21st Century Fox.

After Fox was acquired by Disney in March 2019, Murdoch was named as the chairman and CEO of the Fox Corporation.

Pending lawsuits

Dominion lawsuit 
Lachlan Murdoch and his father Rupert are currently defendants in a $1.6 billion lawsuit filed by voting machine maker Dominion on March 26, 2021, for knowingly and maliciously spreading a false narrative accusing Dominion of election fraud. Dominion claims in the aftermath of Donald Trump's loss of the 2020 election, Fox News began to lose viewership and was negatively impacted as President Trump criticized Fox News and bolstered competitors that would spread his narrative of fraud. Dominion continued that, under the direction of Lachlan Murdoch, Fox News connected Dominion with unsubstantiated fraud and intentionally provided a platform for guests that Fox News' hosts knew were making false and defamatory statements, while Fox News' hosts endorsed, repeated and amplified known defamatory and false statements. 

Fox News Corporation requested that the case be dismissed and on December 16, 2021 the court rejected the request of Fox News with the opinion that "Dominion adequately pleaded actual malice by Fox News."  June 6, 2022 Fox News Corp asked Judge Eric M. Davis to drop the lawsuit. In his opinion Judge Davis denied the request with the opinion that Dominion had shown enough evidence of actual malice on behalf of Rupert and Lachlan Murdoch of Fox Corporation to allow the case to continue.

Smartmatic lawsuit 
In a lawsuit similar to Dominion's, voting machine maker Smartmatic filed a lawsuit implicating both Lachlan Murdoch and his father Rupert for 2.7 billion dollars on February 4, 2021. Smartmatic claims "Fox News engaged in conspiracy to spread disinformation about Smartmatic. They lied, and did so knowingly and intentionally." In March 2022, Justice David Cohen allowed the removal of several hosts as co-defendants but rejected Fox's motion for dismissal of the suit allowing it to go to the discovery phase. In a second attempt from Fox News to dismiss the lawsuit, Justice David Cohen again rejected Fox's request and gave the opinion that Smartmatic had showed a "substantial basis" for their claim that Fox News "showed a reckless disregard for the truth." Both Lachlan and Rupert Murdoch's emails are being sought in discovery to show the extent to which they knew their statements were false.

Crikey controversy 
Lachlan Murdoch sent a series of legal threats to the Crikey website after political editor Bernard Keane tied the Murdochs to Donald Trump's January 6 attempted coup in a June 29 article. Keane gave the opinion “If Trump ends up in the dock for a variety of crimes committed as president, as he should be, not all his co-conspirators will be there with him. Nixon was famously the “unindicted co-conspirator” in Watergate. The Murdochs and their slew of poisonous Fox News commentators are the unindicted co-conspirators of this continuing crisis.” Crikey originally removed the article to avoid legal persecution but later republished it with Editor Peter Fray accusing Murdoch of "using the law to silence public debate," and "seeking to intimidate us."

Personal life
Murdoch married British-born Australian model/actress Sarah O'Hare in 1999. The couple have two sons, Kalan Alexander, born on 9 November 2004, and Aidan Patrick, born on 6 May 2006; and one daughter, Aerin Elisabeth, named for his sister and grandmother, born on 12 April 2010.

In November 2009, Murdoch purchased "Le Manoir", a  mansion in Bellevue Hill for $23 million; and purchased an adjoining  property two years later. In 2017, Murdoch and his wife paid 29 million for a large equestrian property in Aspen, Colorado, that contains a  six-bedroom home. In 2019, they purchased the Chartwell Estate in Los Angeles for an estimated 150 million.

Net worth

Ancestry

See also

 Murdoch family

References

This article contains content from the defunct wiki, HierarchyPedia, used here under the GNU Free Documentation License

Further reading
 Wendy Goldman Rohm Murdoch Mission (2002). Interviews with various Murdoch family members
 Neil Chenoweth Virtual Murdoch (2001). Mainly about Rupert Murdoch
 Paul Barry, Rich Kids, Bantam Books, 2002, 
 Kirkpatrick, David, "Murdoch Gets a Jewel. Who'll Get His Crown?" New York Times, 28 December 2003.
 Milliken, Robert, "Lachlan Murdoch; Heir to the Sun and Sky", The Independent (London), 7 May 1995.
 Pappu, Sridhar, "Lachlan Murdoch, Spiky Punk Heir Right for Post?" New York Observer, 24 November 2003.
 Salamon, Julie, "Television: An American Story; A Family That Tried to Be Both Rich and Good", New York Times, 1 October 2000.
 Manning, Paddy, "The Successor: The High Stakes Life of Lachlan Murdoch" Black Inc [Schwartz Books Pty Ltd] 2022

External links

 

1971 births
Living people
Lachlan
News Corporation people
Businesspeople from London
People from Manhattan
Phillips Academy alumni
Princeton University alumni
Indian Premier League franchise owners
British media executives
British people of Australian descent
British emigrants to the United States
British people of Estonian descent
Businesspeople from Sydney
People from Brentwood, Los Angeles
Australian billionaires
American billionaires
British billionaires
Australian expatriates in the United States